John Lawrence Gane (1837–1895) was a British Liberal Party politician who served as the Member of Parliament for Leeds East from 1886 to 1895.

References

External links 
 Hansard

1837 births
1895 deaths
Politicians from Leeds
Liberal Party (UK) MPs for English constituencies
UK MPs 1886–1892
UK MPs 1892–1895
19th-century English politicians